SpecGram may refer to:

Speculative Grammarian: a satirical linguistics journal.
specgram:  a time-dependent frequency analysis (spectrogram) tool in the Signal Processing Toolbox of MATLAB.